Arleta Podolak (born 24 October 1993, in Warsaw) is a Polish judoka. She competed at the 2016 Summer Olympics in the women's 57 kg event, in which she was eliminated in the first round by Lien Chen-ling.

References

External links
 
 

1993 births
Living people
Polish female judoka
Olympic judoka of Poland
Judoka at the 2016 Summer Olympics
Sportspeople from Warsaw
European Games competitors for Poland
Judoka at the 2015 European Games
21st-century Polish women